Ligiella is a genus of fungi in the family Phallaceae. A monotypic genus, it contains the single species Ligiella rodrigueziana.

Species

References

External links
 Index Fungorum

Phallales
Monotypic Basidiomycota genera
Fungi described in 1980